The following television stations operate on virtual channel 53 in the United States:

 K42IH-D in East Wenatchee, Washington
 KETD in Castle Rock, Colorado
 KGEB in Tulsa, Oklahoma
 W23FC-D in Eau Claire, Wisconsin
 WCDN-LD in Cleveland, Ohio
 WDTA-LD in Atlanta, Georgia
 WEDN in Norwich, Connecticut
 WFLI-TV in Cleveland, Tennessee
 WKGB-TV in Bowling Green, Kentucky
 WLAJ in Lansing, Michigan
 WLMF-LD in Miami, Florida
 WMWC-TV in Galesburg, Illinois
 WPAN in Fort Walton Beach, Florida
 WPGH-TV in Pittsburgh, Pennsylvania
 WQMY in Williamsport, Pennsylvania
 WTTD-LD in Hampton, Virginia
 WUDW-LD in Richmond, Virginia
 WWHO in Chillicothe, Ohio

References

53 virtual